The 1992–93 season of the Venezuelan Primera División, the top category of Venezuelan football, was played by 16 teams. The national champions were Marítimo.

Results

Standings

Championship playoff

External links
Venezuela 1993 season at RSSSF

Venezuelan Primera División seasons
Ven
Ven
1992–93 in Venezuelan football